Kymeta Corporation is a satellite communications company based in the United States. It was founded in August 2012 after spinning out from Intellectual Ventures and manufactures software-enabled, meta-materials based electronic beamforming antennas and terminals for satellite communications.

In March 2017, Kymeta announced commercial availability of its first products, the  mTennaU7 antenna subsystem module (ASM) and KyWay terminal, which are the first metamaterials-based products to be successfully commercialized. Kymeta partnered with Intelsat to offer KĀLO satellite services, which can be bundled with all Kymeta products. As of October 2018, the company has raised nearly $200 million in funding from various investors including Bill Gates and Lux Capital.

In November 2020, Kymeta unveiled its next-generation products and services, the u8. The Kymeta u8 consumes approximately 130 W of power, which can be supplied by most vehicles. The u8 antenna can withstand extreme environmental conditions with operational temperatures of -40 °C to +70 °C while operating.

In March 2022, Kymeta announced the three new product brands for the u8 terminal including the Hawk u8, Goshawk u8, and Osprey u8.

Technology 
Kymeta mTenna technology uses a "holographic" beamforming approach to electronically acquire, steer, and lock a beam to a satellite. It is built using a metamaterials toolset, which uses a thin structure with tuneable metamaterial elements instead of reflecting microwaves like a traditional parabolic antenna or creating thousands of separate signals like a phased array antenna. The flat, lightweight and cost-effective satellite tracking antennas are designed to work seamlessly for communication in high-volume markets where traditional satellite antennas are not currently practical or feasible, such as automotive, maritime, and aviation.

The mTennaU7 has 30,000 individual elements that act collectively to create a holographic beam that can transmit and receive satellite signals. The tunable elements scatter RF energy when activated. Software then activates a pattern of tunable elements to generate a beam. To change the beam direction, the software changes the pattern of activated elements.

Partnerships 

 NASSAT
Turksat
 Airbus Defence and Space
 Inmarsat
 Merck 
 Toyota
 Alidaunia
 e3 systems
 FMC Globalsat
 
 Intelsat
 MCH
 SKY Perfect JSAT Group
 Profen Group
 OneWeb
 Comtech Telecommunications Corp.

References

American companies established in 2011
Companies based in Redmond, Washington
Telecommunications companies of the United States